Ditrigona is a genus of moths belonging to the subfamily Drepaninae. The genus was erected by Frederic Moore in 1888.

Species
species group derocina
Ditrigona derocina (Bryk, 1943)
Ditrigona diana Wilkinson, 1968
Ditrigona pruinosa (Moore, 1888)
species group quinaria
Ditrigona furvicosta (Hampson, 1911)
Ditrigona idaeoides (Hampson, [1893])
Ditrigona inconspicua (Leech, 1898)
Ditrigona innotata (Hampson, 1892)
Ditrigona jardanaria (Oberthür, 1923)
Ditrigona media Wilkinson, 1968
Ditrigona obliquilinea (Hampson, 1892)
Ditrigona quinaria (Moore, 1867)
Ditrigona sericea (Leech, 1898)
Ditrigona spatulata Wilkinson, 1968
Ditrigona spilota Wilkinson, 1968
species group triangularia
Ditrigona fasciata (Hampson, 1893)
Ditrigona polyobotaria (Oberthür, 1923)
Ditrigona pomenaria (Oberthür, 1923)
Ditrigona regularis Warren, 1922
Ditrigona sciara Wilkinson, 1968
Ditrigona titana Wilkinson, 1968
Ditrigona triangularia (Moore, [1868])
Ditrigona typhodes Wilkinson, 1968
species group mytylata
Ditrigona aphya Wilkinson, 1968
Ditrigona artema Wilkinson, 1968
Ditrigona berres Wilkinson, 1968
Ditrigona candida Wilkinson, 1968
Ditrigona chama Wilkinson, 1968
Ditrigona chionea Wilkinson, 1968
Ditrigona cirruncata Wilkinson, 1968
Ditrigona conflexaria (Strand, [1917])
Ditrigona komarovi Kurenzov, 1935
Ditrigona legnichrysa Wilkinson, 1968
Ditrigona lineata (Leech, 1898)
Ditrigona margarita Wilkinson, 1968
Ditrigona marmorea Wilkinson, 1968
Ditrigona mytylata (Guenée, 1868)
Ditrigona platytes Wilkinson, 1968
Ditrigona policharia (Oberthür, 1923)
Ditrigona quinquelineata (Leech, 1898)
Ditrigona sacra (Butler, 1878)
unknown species group
Ditrigona paludicola Holloway, 1998
Ditrigona pentesticha (Chu & Wang, 1987)
Ditrigona wilkinsoni Holloway, 1998

References

External links
A taxonomic revision of the genus Ditrigona (Lepidoptera: Drepanidae: Drepaninae)

Drepaninae
Drepanidae genera